Trieste is a Swiss-designed, Italian-built deep-diving research bathyscaphe which reached a record depth of about  in the Challenger Deep of the Mariana Trench near Guam in the Pacific. On 23 January 1960, Jacques Piccard (son of the boat's designer Auguste Piccard) and US Navy Lieutenant Don Walsh achieved the goal of Project Nekton. It was the first crewed vessel to reach the bottom of the Challenger Deep.

Design

Trieste consisted of a float chamber filled with gasoline (petrol) for buoyancy, with a separate pressure sphere to hold the crew. This configuration (dubbed a "bathyscaphe" by the Piccards) allowed for a free dive, rather than the previous bathysphere designs in which a sphere was lowered to depth and raised again to the surface by a cable attached to a ship.

Trieste was designed by the Swiss scientist Auguste Piccard and originally built in Italy. His pressure sphere, composed of two sections, was built by Acciaierie Terni. The upper part was manufactured by the company Cantieri Riuniti dell'Adriatico, in the Free Territory of Trieste (on the border between Italy and Yugoslavia, now in Italy); hence the name chosen for the bathyscaphe. The installation of the pressure sphere was done in the Cantiere navale di Castellammare di Stabia, near Naples. Trieste was launched on 26 August 1953 into the Mediterranean Sea near the Isle of Capri. The design was based on previous experience with the bathyscaphe FNRS-2. Trieste was operated by the French Navy. After several years of operation in the Mediterranean Sea, the Trieste was purchased by the United States Navy in 1958 for $250,000 (equivalent to $ million today).

At the time of Project Nekton, Trieste was more than 15 m (50 ft) long. The crew occupied the 2.16 m (7.09 ft) pressure sphere, attached to the underside of the float and accessed from the vessel's deck by a vertical shaft that penetrated the float and continued down to the sphere hatch.

The pressure sphere provided just enough room for two people. It provided completely independent life support, with a closed-circuit rebreather system similar to that used in modern spacecraft and spacesuits: oxygen was provided from pressure cylinders, and carbon dioxide was scrubbed from breathing air by being passed through canisters of soda-lime. Batteries provided power.

Trieste was fitted with a new pressure sphere in winter of 1958, manufactured by the Krupp Steel Works of Essen, Germany, in three finely-machined sections (an equatorial ring and two caps), and by the Ateliers de Constructions Mécaniques de Vevey.

The float was necessary because of the sphere's density: it was impossible to design a sphere large enough to hold a person that could withstand the necessary pressures and have metal walls thin enough for the sphere to be neutrally buoyant. Gasoline was chosen as the float fluid because it is less dense than water and also less compressible, thus retaining its buoyant properties and negating the need for thick, heavy walls for the float chamber.

Observation of the sea outside the craft was conducted directly by eye, via a single, very tapered, cone-shaped block of acrylic glass (Plexiglas), the only transparent substance identified which would withstand the external pressure.

 of magnetic iron pellets were placed on the craft as ballast, both to speed the descent and allow ascent since the extreme water pressures would not have permitted compressed air ballast-expulsion tanks to be used at great depths. This additional weight was held in place at the throats of two hopper-like ballast silos by electromagnets. In case of an electrical failure, the bathyscaphe would automatically rise to the surface.

Transported to the Naval Electronics Laboratory's facility in San Diego, California, Trieste was modified extensively by the Americans, and then used in a series of deep-submergence tests in the Pacific Ocean during the next few years, culminating in the dive to the bottom of the Challenger Deep during January 1960.

The Mariana Trench dives
Trieste departed San Diego on 5 October 1959 for Guam aboard the freighter Santa Maria to participate in Project Nekton, a series of very deep dives in the Mariana Trench.

On 23 January 1960, she reached the ocean floor in the Challenger Deep (the deepest southern part of the Mariana Trench), carrying Jacques Piccard and Don Walsh. This was the first time a vessel, crewed or uncrewed, had reached the deepest known point of the Earth's oceans.

After passing , one of the outer Plexiglas window panes cracked, shaking the entire vessel. The two men spent twenty minutes on the ocean floor. The temperature in the cabin was 7 °C (45 °F) at the time. While at maximum depth, Piccard and Walsh unexpectedly regained the ability to communicate with the support ship, USS Wandank (ATA-204), using a sonar/hydrophone voice communications system. At a speed of almost  – about five times the speed of sound in air – it took about seven seconds for a voice message to travel from the craft to the support ship and another seven seconds for answers to return.

While at the bottom, Piccard and Walsh reported observing a number of sole and flounder (both flatfish). The accuracy of this observation has later been questioned and recent authorities do not recognize it as valid. Walsh later said that their original observation could be mistaken as their knowledge of biology was limited. Piccard and Walsh noted that the floor of the Challenger Deep consisted of "diatomaceous ooze". The ascent took 3 hours and 15 minutes. The National Museum of the Navy commemorated the 60th anniversary of the dive in January 2020.

Other deep dives and retirement
The Trieste performed a number of deep dives in the Mediterranean prior to being purchased by the U.S. Navy in 1957. It conducted 48 dives exceeding  between 1953 and 1957 as the "BATISCAFO TRIESTE".

Beginning in April 1963, Trieste was modified and used in the Atlantic Ocean to search for the missing nuclear submarine . Trieste was delivered to Boston Harbor by USS Point Defiance (LSD-31) under the command of Captain H. H. Haisten. Trieste's participation in the search earned her the Navy Unit Commendation.

Following the mission, Trieste was returned to San Diego and taken out of service in 1966. Between 1964 and 1966, Trieste was used to develop her replacement, the Trieste II, with the original Terni pressure sphere reincorporated in her successor. In early 1980, she was transported to the Washington Navy Yard where she remains on exhibit today in the National Museum of the U.S. Navy, along with the Krupp pressure sphere.

Awards
Navy Unit Citation with star
Meritorious Unit Commendation with star
Navy E Ribbon
National Defense Service Medal with star

See also
 Deep Submergence Rescue Vehicle
 Deep Submergence Vehicle
 Alvin (DSV-2)
 Project Mohole
 MIR (submersible)

Notes and references

Bibliography

External links

 The Bathyscaph Trieste Celebrates the 50th Anniversary of the World's Deepest Dive
 Dives of the Bathyscaph Trieste – dictabelt recordings (pdf, p. 38)
 50th anniversary recollection by retired Navy Captain Don Walsh.
 2008 obituary of diver Jaques Piccard
 Trieste Program Dive Log from the Collection of the Naval Undersea Museum
 The Bathyscaph Trieste Technical and Operational Aspects, 1958–1961 by LT Don Walsh, US Navy Electronics Laboratory
 Conservation of the Trieste submarine at the National Museum of the United States Navy

Trieste-class deep-submergence vehicle
Museum ships in Washington, D.C.
Ships preserved in museums
Submarines of Italy
Submarines of the United States Navy
Submarines of Switzerland
Ships built in Trieste
Swiss inventions
1953 ships
Washington Navy Yard